is a passenger railway station located in the city of Matsuyama, Ehime Prefecture, Japan. It is operated by the private transportation company Iyotetsu.

Lines

Layout
The station consists of one island platform with a level crossing.

History
It was renamed on 1 June 1902.

Surrounding area
Hiraimachi Shopping Street (Former Sanuki Highway = Old National Route 11)

See also
 List of railway stations in Japan

References

External links

Iyotetsu Station Information

Iyotetsu Yokogawara Line
Railway stations in Ehime Prefecture
Railway stations in Japan opened in 1893
Railway stations in Matsuyama, Ehime